Tall Timber Short Lines was a magazine dedicated to logging railroads and short line railroads, and was published by Oso Publications. The magazine was founded in 1993 with the title Timber Beast. It was read both by model railroaders and those into logging history and modeling. It was headquartered first in Tacoma, Washington, and then in Hamilton, Montana. The magazine ended publication in August 2008.

All rights and assets were acquired by Narrow Gauge Modeling Co. in June 2019.

See also
Railroad-related periodicals

References

External links
 Narrow Gauge Modeling website
 Tall Timber Short Lines website
 "Until August, 2008 we also published TALL TIMBER SHORT LINES magazine.
 WorldCat record

Defunct magazines published in the United States
Magazines established in 1993
Magazines disestablished in 2008
Magazines published in Montana
Magazines published in Washington (state)
Mass media in Tacoma, Washington
Rail transport magazines published in the United States